Sir Daniel Cooper, 1st Baronet  (1 July 1821 – 5 June 1902) was a nineteenth-century politician, merchant and philanthropist in the Colony of New South Wales. He served as the first speaker of the Legislative Assembly of the colony and was a noted philatelist.

Cooper was conferred the hereditary title of Cooper baronet of Woollahra in 1863, the second of four baronetcy conferred to British expatriates in the Australian colonies.

Early life
He was born at Bolton, Lancashire, England, the son of Thomas Cooper, merchant, and his wife Jane Ramsden. He was the nephew of the emancipated convict and extraordinarily successful businessman, Daniel Cooper, who took an interest in the education of his nephew. He was taken to Sydney by his parents when a child, but was sent back to Britain again in 1835 and spent four years at University College London.

Cooper began business at Le Havre, France, but his health failing, he returned to Sydney in 1843. There, he acquired an interest in a mercantile firm, afterwards known as D. Cooper and Company, and bought much property in Sydney and its suburbs. This afterwards appreciated in value and Cooper became a wealthy man. In 1853 he inherited the bulk of the enormous fortune of his uncle, Daniel, who had no children. He was an early member of the senate of the University of Sydney, to which he gave £500 for a stained glass window, and £1,000 to found a scholarship.

Political career
The district was abolished on 30 June 1851 and he did not contest the 1851 election. Cooper returned to the Legislative Council in 1855 at the by election for Counties of Murray and St Vincent.

New South Wales obtained self-government in 1856, the Legislative Council was abolished and replaced with an elected Legislative Assembly and an appointed Legislative Council. Cooper was elected as the first of 2 members for the district of Sydney Hamlets, which included what were then outer suburbs of Sydney and are now the inner suburbs of Paddington, Surry Hills, Redfern, Chippendale, Glebe, Camperdown, O'Connell Town (north Newtown), Balmain, North Sydney, Kirribilli and McMahons Point. He was re-elected in 1858. The district was abolished in 1859 and replaced by four single member districts. Cooper successfully stood for Paddington from 1859 to 1860. At the first meeting of the Legislative Assembly, Cooper was elected Speaker by a majority of one vote over Henry Parker. His election was not popular, but Cooper held office with dignity and impartiality and set a standard for future speakers. He successfully established rules of procedure and parliamentary conventions, which influenced the Parliament in the following years.

In politics, he was close to Charles Cowper and Henry Parkes and financially supported Parkes' newspaper The Empire. In return it described his political principles as being 'of so liberal a cast that, were he less identified with the great interests of property, he would be set down as a dangerous democrat'.

In January 1860 his health was again troubling him and he found it necessary to resign. He was asked to form a ministry in March, but declined and in 1861 returned to Britain. During the Crimean War he had exerted himself in raising a fund for the relief of widows and children of soldiers, and in the UK in 1863 he did much work to relieve the distress in Lancashire caused by the cotton famine. He continued his interest in New South Wales, did useful work in connexion with the exhibition held at Sydney in 1880, and in 1886 was a member of the Royal Commission for the Colonial and Indian Exhibition at London. In 1897 he was appointed Agent-General for New South Wales in London.

Family
He married, in 1846, Elizabeth Hill, daughter of William Hill of Sydney and Mary Johnson, both convicts, and they had two sons and five daughters.

Cooper died on 5 June 1902 in Kensington, London, and was survived by his wife and by two sons and three of their daughters. He was buried in Brompton Cemetery, London. The eldest son, Daniel Cooper (1848-1909), succeeded as second Baronet, but had only daughters and was himself succeeded by his brother William Charles Cooper (1851-1925) as third Baronet. His great-grandson was the art collector and historian Douglas Cooper.

Philately 
Cooper was a founder and the first president (1869–78) of the Philatelic Society of London, the predecessor of today's Royal Philatelic Society London. His Australian postage stamps, sold to Judge Frederick Philbrick in 1878 for £3,000 (the first four-figure price for a collection), became part of Ferrary's celebrated collection. The Sir Daniel Cooper Lectures, sponsored by the Royal Philatelic Society, are in his honour.

Honours
Cooper was knighted in 1857, created a baronet of Woollahra in 1863, appointed a Knight Commander of the Order of St Michael and St George (KCMG) in 1880 and upgraded to a Knight Grand Cross (GCMG) of the order in 1888.

See also
Political families of Australia: Wentworth/Hill/Griffiths/Scott/Cooper family

Notes

Members of the New South Wales Legislative Assembly
Knights Grand Cross of the Order of St Michael and St George
Baronets in the Baronetage of the United Kingdom
1821 births
1902 deaths
People from Bolton
Politicians from Sydney
Australian people of English descent
Alumni of University College London
Burials at Brompton Cemetery
People educated at University College School
British philatelists
Speakers of the New South Wales Legislative Assembly
19th-century British people
20th-century British people
Presidents of the Royal Philatelic Society London
Australian recipients of a British baronetcy
Fathers of philately
19th-century Australian politicians
Agents-General for New South Wales
Presidents of the Bank of New South Wales
19th-century Australian businesspeople